Happy New Year is a 2017 Indian Kannada anthology film directed by Pannaga Bharana, produced by Vanaja Patil under the banner Soumya Films to be released on May 5, 2017. The film features an ensemble cast consisting of B. C. Patil, Saikumar, Rajshri Ponnappa, Vijaya Raghavendra, Diganth, Dhananjay, Sudharani, Shruthi Hariharan, Sonu Gowda, Margarita and Srushti Patil in the lead roles. Music is composed by Raghu Dixit and art direction done by Esmile for the film. Stunt sequences are choreographed by Thriller Manju.

The principal photography commenced on 22 August 2016 and the film was released on 5 May 2017.

Synopsis 
The movie revolves around five stories interwoven. Raghavendra (Vijaya Raghavendra) is a police constable who is struggling to make time with daughter Pranathi and wife Suma (Sonu Gowda).He is unhappy with his job. Harsha (Diganth) is a IT professional goes for a vacation and that is when he falls in love with Vismaya who is a ardent believer of science .
Venkatramana Bhat (P. Sai Kumar) is a car show room head and Varalaxmi (Sudha Rani) his wife are a childless couple. Venkatramana Bhat is unhappy with his orthodox wife. Danny (Dhananjaya) is a RJ who loves Charvi, who is bedridden due to terminal disease. Danny tries hard to save her. Kourava (B. C. Patil) is a underworld Don who is released from the jail and finds a love. All the characters are in search of meaning in their life. New Year brings a big change in their lives.

Cast
B. C. Patil as Kourava
Saikumar as Venkatramana Bhat
Vijay Raghavendra as Raghavendra
Diganth as Harsha
 Dhananjaya as Danny
Margarita as Esther
Sudharani as Varalakshmi
Sonu Gowda as Suma
Srusti Patil as Vismaya
Shruthi Hariharan  Charvi
Rajshri Ponnappa as Disha
Tabla Nani as Drunkard
Chandru as Credit kanakadasa
RJ Siri as Siri
Master Vishwas as Battery
Baby Aninditha as Pranathi
Gurunandan Bhat K as Chandru
Chiranjeevi Sarja as guest appearance

Soundtrack
The songs and background score for the film are composed by Raghu Dixit. The audio was launched on 20 February 2017 at the KSC Stadium in Bangalore. Actor Sudeep officially launched the album.

References

External links 
 
 

2017 films
2010s coming-of-age drama films
Indian coming-of-age drama films
Films scored by Raghu Dixit
2010s Kannada-language films
Indian anthology films